This is a list of notable footballers who have played for 1. FC Kaiserslautern. Generally, this means players that have played a significant amount of first-class matches for the club. Other players who have played an important role for the club can be included, but the reason why they have been included should be added in the 'Notes' column.

For a list of all 1. FC Kaiserslautern players, major or minor, with a Wikipedia article, see Category:1. FC Kaiserslautern players, and for the current squad see the main 1. FC Kaiserslautern article.

Players are listed according to the date of their first team debut. Appearances and goals are for first-team competitive matches only; wartime matches are excluded. Substitute appearances included.

Table

References 
 1. FC Kaiserslautern at fussballdaten.de 
 Der Betze brennt 

Players

Kaiserslautern, 1. Fc
Association football player non-biographical articles